The 1939 Lafayette Leopards football team was an American football team that represented Lafayette College in the Middle Three Conference during the 1939 college football season. In its third season under head coach Edward Mylin, the team compiled a 4–5 record. Hunter Jaggard was the team captain.

Schedule

References

Lafayette
Lafayette Leopards football seasons
Lafayette Leopards football